Snood may refer to:
 Snood (anatomy), an erectile, fleshy protuberance attached near the base of a turkey's beak
 Snood (headgear), a type of hood or hairnet
 Snood (video game), a 1996 puzzle game
 A type of bait holder used on a crabbing trotline